Lost Monarch is a coast redwood (Sequoia sempervirens) tree in Northern California that is  in diameter at breast height (with multiple stems included), and  in height. It is the world's fifth largest coast redwood in terms of wood volume (the Del Norte Titan was listed as the largest single-stem coast redwood tree, in part because the basal measurements of the Lost Monarch contain multiple stems).

Discovery and location
Lost Monarch was discovered on May 11, 1998, by botanist Stephen C. Sillett, and naturalist Michael Taylor, and is located among other giant redwoods called "The Grove of Titans" in Jedediah Smith Redwoods State Park, although its exact location has not been revealed to the public out of concern that excessive human foot traffic may upset the ecosystem or lead to vandalism. The tree is estimated to contain  of wood volume, and is surrounded by other coastal redwoods known as some of the largest of the species. Of the surrounding redwood trees, some have names from the discoverers, such as El Viejo del Norte, Screaming Titans, Eärendil and Elwing, Stalagmight, and others.

Epiphytes
Lost Monarch supports and provides a habitat for epiphytes including Polypodium scouleri.

See also
 List of individual trees

References

External links
Orion Article: Day of Discovery - Excerpt from The Wild Trees by Richard Preston

Individual coast redwood trees
Redwood National and State Parks